The 2007 Texas A&M–Commerce Lions football team represented Texas A&M University–Commerce—as a member of the North Division of the Lone Star Conference (LSC) during the 2007 NCAA Division II football season. Led by fourth-year head coach Scott Conley, the Lions compiled an overall record of 5–6 with a mark of 5–4 in conference play, winning the LSC North Division title. The team played its home games at Memorial Stadium in Commerce, Texas.

Schedule

Postseason awards

All-Lone Star Conference

LSC Superlatives
Defensive Lineman of the Year: Marcus Smith
Receiver of the Year: JaMichael Palmer
Offensive Lineman of the Year: Darron Sheppard 
Conference Freshman of the Year: Chris Miller

LSC First Team
Alex Contreras, Defensive Back
Nabil El-Amin, Running Back/Return Specialist 
Foaki Fifita, Linebacker
A.J. Johnson, Defensive Line
Elliot Jones, Defensive Back
Deveon McKinney, Offensive Line 
JaMichael Palmer, Wide Receiver 
Luis Salazar, Offensive Line
Darron Sheppard, Offensive Line
Garnet Smith, Linebacker
Marcus Smith, Defensive Line

LSC Second Team
Terry Mayo, Quarterback
Daniel Swaim, Punter

LSC Honorable Mention
Trae Grimes, Fullback

References

Texas AandM-Commerce
Texas A&M–Commerce Lions football seasons
Texas AandM-Commerce Football